Nawiliwili Beach Park is a beach park and port on the south-east coast of the island of Kauai in the Hawaiian Islands.
It is at the south end of Hawaii Route 51, known as Rice Street. Just to the west is Niumalu Beach Park. Across Nāwiliwili Bay is Kawai Point.

References

Beaches of Kauai
Protected areas of Kauai
Parks in Hawaii